The hyperbass flute is conceptually the largest and lowest-pitched instrument in the flute family, although it is extremely rare. It first appeared at the turn of the 21st century, and only two are known to exist. Its lowest note is C0, one octave below the lowest C on a standard piano, which at 16 hertz is considered at or below the threshold of human hearing.

The first playable example was built by Florentine craftsman Francesco Romei for Italian flautist Roberto Fabbriciani, inventor and first performer of the instrument. He called it the hyperbass flute.
This first instrument was made from PVC and wood, with wide tone holes made from standard tee fittings, but without keys; these are covered with the palms of the hands.
Low flute specialist Peter Sheridan commissioned the first fully chromatic hyperbass flute, from the Dutch maker Jelle Hogenhuis in August 2010.

Repertoire

The first composition for the hyperbass flute with live electronics and magnetic tape is Persistenza della memoria by Alessandro Grego, published in 2001 by the ARTS label on the CD Flute XX vol.2. In 2002, the Italian composer Nicola Sani composed Con Fuoco (for hyperbass flute and 8-track magnetic tape), which Fabbriciani recorded at the electronic studio of the Westdeutscher Rundfunk (WDR) in Cologne, Germany. The track was released on a CD called Elements on the Stradivarius label.

In March 2005 Fabbriciani released an entire CD of music for hyperbass flute and tape, Glaciers in Extinction, on the Col Legno label.

In 2010, Fabbriciani released another hyperbass flute CD entitled Winds of the Heart, this time with tárogató player Esther Lamneck, on the Innova label. In 2013, Fabbriciani released another hyperbass flute CD entitled Alchemies, on the Brilliant label.

Peter Sheridan recorded Groaning Oceans for hyperbass flute and electronics by Dominy Clements in 2014, and played the hyperbass in Decodificando El Universo by Chilean composer Andrián Pertout in its première 2021 recording. He also performs and records on low flutes, including the hyperbass, in the Monash University Flute Ensemble.

References

External links
 Contrabass Compendium: Big Flutes (archived)
 Roberto Fabriciani on YouTube, featuring works for the flauto iperbasso

Side-blown flutes
Contrabass instruments